Bukowiec  ( Bukovets’) is a former village, located in the administrative district of Gmina Solina, within Bieszczady County, Subcarpathian Voivodeship, in south-eastern Poland, close to the border with Ukraine.

References

Bukowiec
Former populated places in Poland
Former villages